Cedar Grove is a settlement in the far north of the island of Antigua. 

It is located to the east of the island's northernmost headlands, Boon Point.

History 
Around the 1850s, the name of Cedar Grove was Willocks Village, although some American maps used this name until the 1940s.

Demographics

Cedar Grove is classified as "lower medium income", however, it is still one of the best parts of the nation to live in, having a Living Conditions Index of 14.26.

There are three enumeration districts in Cedar Grove.

 30300 Cedar Grove-East 
 30400 Cedar Grove-St. James 
 30500 Cedar Grove-South

References 

Populated places in Antigua and Barbuda
Saint John Parish, Antigua and Barbuda